The Reddings was an American funk, soul and disco band, founded by Otis Redding's sons Dexter (bass and vocals) and Otis Redding III (guitar) together with Mark Lockett (drums, keys, and lead vocal).

Their most well-known songs include "Remote Control" (1980) / "Doin' it" / "Funkin On The One" / "Class (Is What You Got)" (1981) / "Sittin' on the Dock of the Bay" (1982) / "Hand Dance" (1983) and "The Awakening" (1980), a bass-drums-duet which is often performed live by Les Claypool (Primus) and on his album Highball with the Devil.

Their album The Reddings was released on November 26, 1988, and reached a peak position of #88 on the US Billboard album chart. It featured a hit single "Call The Law," which reached peak position of #16 on the Billboard Hot Black Singles Chart on November 26, 1988.

In December 1980, "Remote Control," from the first album by the Reddings (The Awakening), went to #6 on the Billboard Hot Soul Singles chart, and peaked at #89 on the Billboard Hot 100. The tune was sampled in an episode of the 1980s television programme, WKRP in Cincinnati. Written by Nick Mann, Bill Beard, and Chet Fortune of the Washington, DC based songwriting team of Last Colony Music http://www.discogs.com/artist/Nick+Mann, "Remote Control" continues to receive airplay around the world in places like Belgium, France, Italy, and The Netherlands.

In 1979–1980, Dexter, Otis III, and Mark recorded this album with producers Russell Timmons and Nick Mann at the Believe in a Dream studio, which was located in downtown Washington, D.C.

Discography
The Awakening (1980)
Class (1981)
Steamin' Hot (1982)
Back To Basics (1983)
If Looks Could Kill (1985)
The Reddings (1988)

References

External links

American funk musical groups
American soul musical groups